Jose Gomez is a retired American soccer midfielder who played professionally in the USL A-League.  He was the Associate Head Coach of the Liberty University men's soccer team. Gomez is currently the DI Head Coach at Charleston Southern University.

Player
Gomez graduated from Lakeland Christian School, where he was a part of four high school state championship teams.  His team won two titles and finished runner-up twice.  He attended Liberty University, playing on the men’s soccer team from 1997 to 2000.  He was the 2000 Big South Conference Player of the Year  A starter for all 67 games of his collegiate career, Gomez finished his days in a Liberty uniform with 77 points, 32 goals and 13 assists. At the time of his induction into the Liberty Athletics Hall of Fame, Gomez’s 32 career goals ranked fifth-best in program history. Gomez graduated with a bachelor's degree in business management and later went back to complete his Masters in Business Administration. He is currently a PhD candidate earning a Doctorate in Business Administration from Liberty University. In February 2001, the Charlotte Eagles selected Gomez in the first round (twenty-third overall) of the USL A-League draft.  He was 2002 Second Team All League.  He was the first men's soccer player to ever be drafted from Liberty University.  Gomez spent three seasons in Charlotte then moved to the Virginia Beach Mariners in 2004.  He played two seasons with the Mariners, then retired from professional soccer on June 2, 2005.

Coach
In 2005, Gomez moved to Palm Beach, Florida where he became the head coach of the Palm Beach Atlantic University soccer team.  He was named the Men's Associate Head Coach at his alma mater Liberty University in January 2014. Most recently, Gomez is the Division I Head Coach at Charleston Southern University since 2020.

Family
In 2005, Jose married Carrie Cruciano in Virginia Beach, Virginia.  The two met through mutual friends at Liberty University.  They have three children and reside in Charleston, SC.

Honors
 Liberty University
2000 Big South Player of the Year
2013 Named to the inaugural Big South Conference All-Decade Team. Part of the Big South’s 30th anniversary celebration, the all-decade teams were determined by conference administrators and fan voting.
Liberty University Hall of Fame Inductee 2022.
 Charlotte Eagles
2002 Second Team All League
Palm Beach Atlantic University
NCCAA Coach of the Year 2010.

References

Living people
1977 births
American soccer players
American soccer coaches
Charlotte Eagles players
Liberty Flames men's soccer players
Virginia Beach Mariners players
A-League (1995–2004) players
USL First Division players
People from Valrico, Florida
Sportspeople from Lakeland, Florida
Association football midfielders
Sportspeople from Hillsborough County, Florida
Palm Beach Atlantic Sailfish men's soccer coaches
Liberty Flames soccer coaches